Seine-Saint-Denis' seventh constituency is a French legislative constituency in the Seine-Saint-Denis département (north-east of Paris).

Description

Deputies

Election results

2022

 
 
 
 
 
 
|-
| colspan="8" bgcolor="#E9E9E9"|
|-

2017

 
 
 
 
 
 
 
 
|-
| colspan="8" bgcolor="#E9E9E9"|
|-

2012

Razzy Hammadi is elected without opponent in the second round following the withdrawal of Jean-Pierre Brard.

 
 
 
 
 
 
 
|-
| colspan="8" bgcolor="#E9E9E9"|
|-

2007
The constituency was one of just two (the other being Nord's 19th constituency) in which there was only one candidate in the second round, thus guaranteeing his re-election. The law provides that candidates obtaining the votes of at least 12.5% of registered voters in the first round advance to the second round. The parties of the mainstream left had a nationwide agreement whereby if two of them advanced to the second round, the second-placed would automatically withdraw. Primarily, this was to avoid dividing the left-wing or centre-left electorate in constituencies where a right-wing, centre-right or far-right candidate had also reached the second round. In Montreuil, however, the Communist and Socialist candidates were the only ones to reach the second round, respectively in first and second place. Socialist candidate Mouna Viprey honoured the agreement and withdrew, enabling Brard to be re-elected in a walkover. 30.17% of voters nonetheless cast a blank ballot.

2002

 
 
 
 
 
 
 
|-
| colspan="8" bgcolor="#E9E9E9"|
|-

1997

 
 
 
 
 
 
 
|-
| colspan="8" bgcolor="#E9E9E9"|
|-

References

7